James Samuel Brookes was an English professional footballer. A right half, he played three Football League games for Blackpool, his only known club, in 1901. He scored one goal in those three games.

References
Specific

General

Year of birth missing
Year of death missing
English footballers
Blackpool F.C. players
Association football wing halves